The North Pacific Cannery (NPC) located near Port Edward, British Columbia, Canada, is one of the longest standing canneries in the Port Edward area. NPC was founded in 1889 by Angus Rutherford Johnston, John Alexander Carthew, and Alexander Gilmore McCandless. The plant stopped processing salmon in 1968, becoming a reduction plant until its closure in 1981 after 80 years of operations.

NPC Museum 

The North Pacific Cannery was built at the mouth of the Skeena River on “Cannery Row”. The 183 acres of land was purchased for $32 by Carthew. In order for the North Coast Marine Museum Society to preserve NPC, it had to receive funds up to $4 million, which was succeeded by the canneries 100th anniversary in 1989. NPC has 25 buildings that can be toured, including a visitor centre, canning loft, First Nations and Japanese bunk houses, European house, and the Mess House, which has been turned into a small café.

Timeline of NPC

The North Coast Marine Museum Society 

In 1979, five local Port Edward community members formed The North Coast Marine Museum Society in order to save the North Pacific Cannery. NPC was not the first cannery looked at. Inverness Cannery, located next to NPC, was considered initially in 1973 but a fire destroyed the plant causing the Board of Directors to move the plans onto NPC. The North Coast Marine Museum Society originally started as The North Coast Fishing Exhibit which displayed artifacts from the fishing communities in the Prince Rupert, BC mall. In August 1985 the North Coast Marine Museum Society moved all of their artifacts to the cannery. In 1987 the BC Packers handed over the keys to the North Pacific Cannery and by gifting the cannery $840,000 and $10,000 worth contribution for the restoration of the plant, NPC was considered a national historic site.

Further reading 

 Dawson, Donald. “Canner receives grant for restoration.” The Daily Mail, May 2, 2000, North Pacific Cannery Village Museum, Prince Rupert City and Regional Archives.
 Napastiuk, Pavlina. “North Pacific gets $250,000 boost.” The Daily Mail. May 27, 2003, North Pacific Cannery Village Museum, Prince Rupert City and Regional Archives.

References 

Tourist attractions in British Columbia
National Historic Sites in British Columbia
Seafood canneries
1889 establishments in British Columbia
1981 disestablishments in British Columbia